The Plymouth Backpack was a front wheel drive concept car, Unveiled at the 1995 Chicago Auto show at the same time as other concepts, the Chrysler Thunderbolt and the Eagle Jazz, the Plymouth Back pack was a small pickup truck concept vehicle. A front wheel drive vehicle, the quirky Back pack could carry two passengers with ease, and even left enough room for a laptop on a small table inside the cabin. A bike rack on the back was also built into the vehicle.

Tom Gale, Chrysler's design chief that had visions of the future vehicles of the company; 'not what Plymouth is today, but what it will be', designed the sporty Backpack. The Back Pack was such a vehicle, and it was based on Neon underpinnings. Producing 135 horsepower, the Back Pack featured a MoPar 2-liter OHC 4-cylinder engine.

References 

Backpack
Front-wheel-drive vehicles
Pickup trucks